CDS Global, Inc. is a multinational corporation based in Des Moines, Iowa, that provides business process outsourcing and customer data management to various industries worldwide.

They handle 710 million consumer sales promotions, 65 million customer service interactions and 1 billion transactions annually, including 180 million payments totalling $7.1 billion,  through 16 facilities in the U.S., and the U.K.

CDS Global is a wholly owned subsidiary of Hearst Corporation and is the largest magazine fulfillment house in North America.

History
In 1971, Look magazine built a computer system that, for the first time, stored the names and addresses of their customers on magnetic tape.

Two months later, when Look ceased publication, six employees took this new fulfillment service to Edward Downe, Jr., publisher of Ladies Home Journal and The American Home. He agreed to be their first client, and owner, opening Downe Computer Services April 1, 1972, with 172 employees.

In 1977, the Charter Company in Jacksonville, Florida, bought out Downe Communications’ stock and renamed the company Charter Data Services (CDS).

Hearst Corporation acquired two Charter Company properties in 1982, Redbook and CDS, which they rechristened Communications Data Services and then, in 2007, CDS Global.

The number of magazine titles served increased as CDS Global acquired other fulfillment companies, including Tower Publishing  and Optima  in the U.K. and INDAS in Canada. Electronic payment capabilities were expanded when CDS Global acquired PayDQ in 2011.

Divisions

CDS Global supports 1,141 brands with marketing, order management, order fulfillment, payment processing and document presentment services.

Media
CDS Global is the largest magazine fulfillment service provider, managing more than 1,000 print and digital magazine titles.

Non-profit
CDS Global provides donations processing, donor acknowledgements, marketing services and customer service to non-profits.

Higher education
CDS Global provides gift processing, donor/alumni acknowledgements, fulfillment services and customer service to higher education institutions.

Consumer products
CDS Global provides ecommerce and web store solutions,  including cross-selling and conversion marketing.

Utilities
Public utilities use CDS Global’s electronic billing and payment services, with additional support for customer service, resource management, cash flow and regulatory compliance.

Services

Customer service
Customer care agents deliver mail, online, email, chat and phone support, for billing, sales and level-one technical issues.

Data
CDS Global manages 159 million customer files for nearly 60 percent of the publishing industry and advises businesses on transactional, communication and service best practices.

Ecommerce
Client-branded web stores are supported by order management, payment processing, warehousing, fulfillment, distribution and customer service.

Mailing
Services include printing, personalization and presorting of acknowledgements, bills and renewals.

Marketing
710 million personalized print and digital communications, delivered via email, mail and phone. 95,000 online marketing pages managed.

Order management and fulfillment
In addition to physical product delivery, CDS Global handles subscriptions, recurring billings, digital access, and account services.

Payment
CDS Global supports paper, electronic, mobile, walk-in and interactive voice response options with: 
 Electronic bill presentment and payment
 Lockbox and remittance processing
 Online banking and bill payment consolidation
 Bill printing and mailing services
 Data capture and image archive

Warehousing and distribution
Facilities in the U.S. and the U.K. provide inventory management, kitting and assembly, integration and logistics.

References

Companies based in Iowa
Companies based in Des Moines, Iowa
Business software companies
Business process outsourcing companies
Payment service providers
Outsourcing companies
Marketing companies of the United States
Customer relationship management software companies
Hearst Communications assets